The Professional Footballers' Association Team of the Year (often called the PFA Team of the Year, or simply the Team of the Year) is an annual award given to a set of 55 footballers across the top four tiers of men's English football; the Premier League, the Championship, League One and League Two, as well as the women's FA WSL, who are seen to be deserving of being named in a "Team of the Year". Peter Shilton currently holds the most appearances in the PFA Team of the Year in the top division with 10 appearances. Steven Gerrard currently holds the most appearances in the PFA Team of the Year in the Premier League era with eight appearances.

The award has been presented since the 1973–74 season and the shortlist is compiled by the members of the players' trade union, the Professional Footballers' Association (PFA), in January of every year, with the winners then being voted for by the other players in their respective divisions. The award is regarded by players in the Football League as the highest accolade available to them, due to it being picked by their fellow professionals. In 2014, a team for female players competing in the FA WSL was selected for the first time.

Winners
PFA Team of the Year (1970s)
PFA Team of the Year (1980s)
PFA Team of the Year (1990s)
PFA Team of the Year (2000s)
PFA Team of the Year (2010s)
PFA Team of the Year (2020s)

References

External links
The official website of the Professional Footballers' Association

 
English football trophies and awards
Awards established in 1974
1974 establishments in England